Cyrtopogon is a genus of robber flies in the family Asilidae. There are at least 120 described species in Cyrtopogon.

See also
 List of Cyrtopogon species

References

Further reading

External links

 
 

Asilidae genera
Articles created by Qbugbot